Tabulated below are the medals and overall rankings for host nations in each Summer Paralympics and Winter Paralympics, based on individual Games medals tables.

Summer Paralympics

Winter Paralympics

External links 
 The Geopolitics of Winter Olympic Medal Counts, The Atlantic, February 7, 2014
 One Benefit of Hosting the Olympics? More Medals, NPR, August 8, 2012

host